Ojo is a character from the fictional Oz book series by L. Frank Baum.

History
He first appeared in The Patchwork Girl of Oz. Ojo is a Munchkin who lived with his uncle, Unc Nunkie in the Blue Forest, a remote location in the north of the Munchkin Country.  During a trip with his uncle to visit his uncle's friend Dr. Pipt, Ojo learns from Pipt's wife, Dame Margolotte, that he is known to others as "Ojo the Unlucky." Ojo discovers rationalizations for this, including the fact that he was born on Friday the 13th, is left-handed, and has a wart under his arm, and he begins to believe that bad luck follows him wherever he goes.  However, the Tin Woodman officially deems him Ojo the Lucky after hearing these reasons because he believes Ojo's bad luck is due to a self-fulfilling prophecy.

Ojo later starred in his own book, Ojo in Oz by Ruth Plumly Thompson. In this book, Thompson picked up a dropped thread of Baum's about Ojo being possibly related to royalty and made him the Prince of Seebania, whose family was enchanted by an evil sorcerer named Mooj, causing his father, King Ree Alla Bad, to run around Oz as a bandit called Realbad.

Although Ojo is a Munchkin, he seems to be taller than the Munchkins Dorothy met during her first trip to Oz, though this is never stated.  It is usually surmised from a passage in which Dr. Pipt refers to  Ojo getting "taller," though only the comparative form of the word is used.  Neither Ojo nor Unc Nunkie are described as "tall".

In John R. Neill's books, Ojo is attendant to Kabumpo. This is never explained, but nothing precludes it from being a task a young prince's parents might force him to endure.

Popular culture
 Ojo appears as a main character in Lost In Oz voiced by Jorge Diaz.
 Ojo appears in Emerald City, portrayed by Ólafur Darri Ólafsson. He appears as a member of the Munja'kin tribe.
 Ojo appears in Dorothy and the Wizard of Oz, voiced by Kari Wahlgren.

References

Oz (franchise) characters
Child characters in literature
Male characters in literature
Literary characters introduced in 1913
Fictional princes